Kumarlı may refer to:

 Kumarli, Iran, a town located in Tehran, Iran
 Kumarlı, Kahramanmaraş, a town situated in the central (Kahramanmaraş) district of Kahramanmaraş Province, Turkey
 Kumarlı, Çarşamba, a village in the district of Çarşamba, Samsun Province, Turkey
 Ören, Boyabat, a village in the district of Boyabat, Sinop Province, Turkey